S1P may refer to:

 Site-1 Protease
 Sphingosine-1-Phosphate